Bulldog Drummond's Peril is a 1938 American adventure crime mystery film directed by James P. Hogan and starring John Barrymore and John Howard. The film is based on Herman C. McNeile's novel The Third Round.

Plot
The intended wedding of Captain Hugh "Bulldog" Drummond (John Howard) to Phyllis Clavering (Louise Campbell) at her villa in Switzerland is stopped short (once again) when someone murders the Swiss policeman who is guarding their wedding presents. The killer makes off with their prize possession, a synthetic diamond, made by a secret process by Professor Bernard Goodman (Halliwell Hobbes), the father of their good friend Gwen Longworth (Nydia Westman). A guest, Sir Raymond Blantyre (Matthew Boulton), head of the Metropolitan Diamond Syndicate, disappears at the same time, and Drummond suspects that Sir Raymond, who has the most to lose if Professor Goodman proceeds with his plans to publish his secret process, has something to do with the theft. He leaves Phyllis and chases back to England.

Colonel Nielsen (John Barrymore), of Scotland Yard, as usual scoffs at Drummond's suspicions and insists that a man as respected as Sir Raymond could not possibly be involved in such a crime. An explosion that wrecks Goodman's house, and apparently kills him, makes Drummond more positive that the diamond king has again resorted to murder to protect his business. He follows Professor Botulian (Porter Hall), a lifelong rival of Goodman's, whom he believes to be involved in the affair. His hunt leads him to a lonely house on the outskirts of London where he finds Goodman a prisoner. Drummond's valet Tenny (E.E. Clive) soon joins them as captive, but brings with him the means of escape. After Goodman is taken to safety, Drummond discovers that Phyllis, who was searching for him, is now being held by the crooks. Drummond quickly returns to the house to confront Sir Raymond and his armed confederates. Drummond begins to fight his way out, but is met by superior forces.

Cast
 John Barrymore as Colonel Neilson
 John Howard as Captain Hugh C. 'Bulldog' Drummond
 Louise Campbell as Phyllis Clavering
 Reginald Denny as Algy Longworth
 E.E. Clive as Tenny
 Porter Hall as Dr. Max Botulian
 Elizabeth Patterson as Aunt Blanche Clavering
 Nydia Westman as Gwen Longworth
 Michael Brooke as Anthony Greer
 Halliwell Hobbes as Professor Bernard Goodman
 Matthew Boulton as Sir Raymond Blantyre
 Zeffie Tilbury as Mrs. Weevens
 David Clyde as Constable McThane
 Clyde Cook as Constable Sacker
 Austin Fairman as Roberts

See also
 Public domain film
 List of American films of 1938
 List of films in the public domain in the United States

References

External links

Films based on Bulldog Drummond
1938 films
American mystery films
1930s English-language films
American black-and-white films
1930s romance films
American crime thriller films
1930s crime thriller films
1938 adventure films
Films directed by James Patrick Hogan
1930s mystery films
American romantic thriller films
Paramount Pictures films
1930s American films